Thailand's Got Talent season 7 (also known as TGT) was the seventh season of the Thailand's Got Talent reality television series on the Workpoint TV television network, and part of the global British Got Talent series. It is a talent show that features singers, dancers, sketch artists, comedians and other performers of all ages competing for the advertised top prize of 1,000,000 Baht. The show debuted on 6 August 2018. Thailand is also the fifth country in Asia to license Got Talent series. The four judges Yuhtlerd Sippapak, Jennifer Kim, Cris Horwang and Pongsak Rattanaphong join hosts Ketsepsawat Palagawongse na Ayutthaya.

Auditions
{|
|  Yes
|-
|  No
|-
|  Golden buzzer
|-
| 
|}

Week 1 (August 6, 2018)

Week 2 (August 13, 2018)

Week 3 (August 20, 2018)

Week 4 (August 27, 2018)

Week 5 (September 3, 2018)

Week 6 (September 10, 2018)

Week 7 (September 17, 2018)

Week 8 (September 24, 2018)

Week 9 (October 1, 2018)

Week 10 (October 8, 2018)

Semifinals

Semifinalists
 | 
 |  | 
{|
|  Golden buzzer
|-
|  Judges' Pick
|}

Semifinals summary
 Buzzed out
 Judges' pick
 | 
 |

Week 11 - Semi-final 1 (October 15, 2018)

Week 12 - Semi-final 2 (October 22, 2018)

Week 13 - Semi-final 3 (October 29, 2018)

Week 14 - Semi-final 4 (November 5, 2018)

Final

Week 15 - Final (November 12, 2018)

 Winner
 Runner-up

References

External links 
 
 
 
 

Thailand's Got Talent seasons
2018 Thai television seasons